Masashi Shimada (born 1 July 1971) is a Japanese professional golfer.

Shimada plays on the Japan Golf Tour, where he has won once.

Professional wins (2)

Japan Golf Tour wins (1)

*Shortened to 54 holes due to weather.

Other wins (1)
2001 Chubu Open

External links

Japanese male golfers
Japan Golf Tour golfers
Sportspeople from Shiga Prefecture
1971 births
Living people